Religion in Canada encompasses a wide range of groups and beliefs. Christianity is the largest religion in Canada, with Catholicism being its largest denomination. Christians, representing 53.3% of the population in 2021, which has fallen from 67.3% in 2011, are followed by people having no religion at 34.6% of the total population. Catholics represent 29.3% while Protestants represents 20.3%. Catholics have declined 2 million followers in just ten years. Other faiths include Islam (4.9%), Hinduism (2.3%), Sikhism (2.1%), Buddhism (1.0%), Judaism (0.9%), Indigenous spirituality (0.2%) and Jainism (0.1%).

Rates of religious adherence are steadily decreasing. The preamble to the Canadian Charter of Rights and Freedoms refers to God. The monarch carries the title of "Defender of the Faith". However, Canada has no official religion, and support for religious pluralism and freedom of religion is an important part of Canada's political culture. 
 
Before the European colonization, a wide diversity of Aboriginal religions and belief systems were largely animistic or shamanistic, including an intense tribal reverence for spirits and nature. The French colonization beginning in the 16th century established a Roman Catholic francophone population in New France, especially Acadia (later Lower Canada, now Nova Scotia and Quebec). British colonization brought waves of Anglicans and other Protestants to Upper Canada, now Ontario. The Russian Empire spread Eastern Orthodoxy to a small extent to the tribes in the far north and western coasts, particularly hyperborean nomadics like the Inuit; Orthodoxy would arrive on the mainland with immigrants from the Soviet Union, Eastern Bloc, Greece and elsewhere during the 20th century.

With Christianity in decline after having once been central and integral to Canadian culture and daily life, Canada has become a post-Christian, secular state despite the majority of Canadians claiming an affiliation with Christianity. The majority of Canadians consider religion to be unimportant in their daily lives, but still believe in God. The practice of religion is now generally considered a private matter throughout society and the state. On Sundays, between 15 and 25 percent of Catholic Canadians attend Mass (15 percent weekly attenders and another 9 percent monthly).

Religious pluralism

Canada today has no state religion, and the Government of Canada is officially committed to religious pluralism. While the Canadian government's official ties to religion, specifically Christianity are few, the Preamble to the Canadian Charter of Rights and Freedoms makes reference to "the supremacy of God. The national anthem in both official languages also refers to God. Nevertheless, the rise of irreligion within the country and influx of non-Christian peoples has led to a greater separation of government and religion, demonstrated in forms like  "Christmas holidays" being called "winter festivals" in public schools. Some religious schools are government-funded as per Section Twenty-nine of the Canadian Charter of Rights and Freedoms.

Canada is a Commonwealth realm in which the head of state is shared with 14 other countries. As such, Canada follows the United Kingdom's succession laws for its monarch, which bar Roman Catholics from inheriting the throne. Within Canada, the monarch's title includes the phrases "By the Grace of God" and "Defender of the Faith."

Christmas and Easter are nationwide holidays, and while Jews, Muslims, and other religious groups are allowed to take their holy days off work, they do not share the same official recognition. In 1957, the Parliament declared Thanksgiving "a day of general thanksgiving to almighty God for the bountiful harvest with which Canada has been blessed."

There was an ongoing battle in the late 20th century to have religious garb accepted throughout Canadian society, mostly focused on Sikh turbans. The Canadian Armed Forces authorized the wearing of turbans in 1986, eventually the Royal Canadian Mounted Police followed in 1988 and eventually other federal government agencies accepted members wearing turbans.

History

Before 1800s

Before the arrival of Europeans, the First Nations followed a wide array of mostly animistic religions and spirituality. The first Europeans to settle in great numbers in Canada were French Latin Rite Roman Catholics, including a large number of Jesuits who established several missions in North America. They were dedicated to converting the Natives; an effort that eventually proved successful.

The first large Protestant communities were formed in the Maritimes after they were conquered by the British. Unable to convince enough British immigrants to go to the region, the government decided to import continental Protestants from Germany and Switzerland to populate the region and counterbalance the Roman Catholic Acadians. This group was known as the Foreign Protestants. This effort proved successful and today the South Shore region of Nova Scotia is still largely Lutheran. After the Expulsion of the Acadians beginning in 1755 a large number of New England Planters settled on the vacated lands bringing with them their Congregationalist belief. During the 1770s, guided by Henry Alline, the New Light movement of the Great Awakening swept through the Atlantic region converting many of the Congregationalists to the new theology. After Alline's death many of these Newlights eventually became Baptists, thus making Maritime Canada the heartland of the Baptist movement in Canada.

The Quebec Act of 1774 acknowledged the rights of the Roman Catholic Church throughout Lower Canada in order to keep the French Canadians loyal to Britannic Crown. Roman Catholicism is still the main religion of French Canadians today.

The American Revolution beginning in 1765 brought a large influx of Protestants to Canada when United Empire Loyalists, fleeing the rebellious United States, moved in large numbers to Upper Canada and the Maritimes. They comprised a mix of Christian groups with a large number of Anglicans, but also many Presbyterians and Methodists.

1800s to 1900s
While Anglicans consolidated their hold on the upper classes, workingmen and farmers responded to the Methodist revivals, often sponsored by visiting preachers from the United States. Typical was Rev. James Caughey, an American sent by the Wesleyan Methodist Church from the 1840s through 1864. He brought in the converts by the score, most notably in the revivals in Western Canada from 1851 to 1853. His technique combined restrained emotionalism with a clear call for personal commitment, coupled with follow-up action to organize support from converts. It was a time when the holiness movement caught fire, with the revitalized interest of men and women in Christian perfection. Caughey successfully bridged the gap between the style of earlier camp meetings and the needs of more sophisticated Methodist congregations in the emerging cities.

In the early nineteenth century in the Maritimes and Upper Canada, the Anglican Church held the same official position it did in England. This caused tension within English Canada, as much of the populace was not Anglican. Increasing immigration from Scotland created a very large Presbyterian community and they and other groups demanded equal rights. This was an important cause of the 1837 Rebellion in Upper Canada. With the arrival of responsible governments, the Anglican monopoly was ended.

In Lower Canada, the Roman Catholic Church was officially pre-eminent and had a central role in the colony's culture and politics. Unlike English Canada, French Canadian nationalism became very closely associated with Roman Catholicism. During this period, the Roman Catholic Church in the region became one of the most reactionary in the world. Known as Ultramontane Catholicism, the church adopted positions condemning all manifestations of liberalism.

In politics, those aligned with the Roman Catholic clergy in Quebec were known as les bleus (the blues). They formed a curious alliance with the staunchly monarchist and pro-British Anglicans of English Canada (often members of the Orange Order) to form the basis of the Canadian Conservative Party. The Reform Party, which later became the Liberal Party, was largely composed of the anti-clerical French Canadians, known as les rouges (the reds) and the non-Anglican Protestant groups. In those times, right before elections, parish priests would give sermons to their flock where they said things like  ("the sky (heaven) is blue and hell is red").

In 1871, national census revealed 56.45% as Protestants, 42.80% as Roman Catholic, 0.05% as Pagans, 0.03% as Jewish, 0.02% as Mormons, 0.15% as irreligious and 0.49% as unspecified.

By the late nineteenth century, Protestant pluralism had taken hold in English Canada. While much of the elite were still Anglican, other groups, including the Methodists, had become very prominent as well. The schools and universities created at this time reflected this pluralism with major centres of learning being established for each faith. One, King's College, later the University of Toronto, was set up as a non-denominational school. The influence of the Orange Order was strong, especially among Irish Protestant immigrants, and comprised a powerful anti-Catholic force in Ontario politics; its influence faded away after 1920.

The late nineteenth century also saw the beginning of a large shift in Canadian immigration patterns. Large numbers of Irish and Southern European immigrants were creating new Roman Catholic communities in English Canada. Western Canada saw the arrival of significant Eastern Orthodox immigrants from Eastern Europe as well as Mormon and Pentecostal immigrants from the United States and Ireland.

1900s to 1960s

In 1919–20 Canada's five major Protestant denominations (Anglican, Baptist, Congregational, Methodist, and Presbyterian) cooperatively undertook the "Forward Movement." The goal was to raise funds and to strengthen Christian spirituality in Canada. The movement invoked Anglophone nationalism by linking donations with the Victory Loan campaigns of the First World War, and stressed the need for funds to Canadianize immigrants. Centred in Ontario, the campaign was a clear financial success, raising over $11 million. However the campaign exposed deep divisions among Protestants, with the traditional Evangelists speaking of a personal relationship with God and the more liberal denominations emphasizing the Social Gospel and good works. Both factions (apart from the Anglicans) agreed on prohibition, which was demanded by the WCTU.

As of 1931, Roman Catholics were the largest religious body in Canada, with 4 million people. Following it were the United Church of Canada (including Methodists, Congregationalists and Presbyterians), with 2 million; the Anglican Church, with nearly 2 million; and the Presbyterian Church, with approximately 870,000. The Canada Year Book 1936 reported that "of the non-Christian sects, 155,614 or 1.50% were Jews, 24,087 or 0.23% were Confucians, 15,784 or 0.15% were Buddhists and 5,008 or 0.05% were pagans.

Domination of Canadian society by Protestant and Roman Catholic elements continued until well into the 20th century. Until the 1960s, most parts of Canada still had extensive Lord's Day laws that limited what one could do on a Sunday. The English Canadian elite were still dominated by Protestants, and Jews and Roman Catholics were often excluded. A slow process of liberalization began after the Second World War in English Canada. Overtly Christian laws were expunged, including those against homosexuality. Policies favouring Christian immigration were also abolished.

In 1951, a nationwide census was taken after incorporation of predominantly Protestant province of Newfoundland and Labrador.

According to statistics provided by Statistics Canada, Protestants held a slight majority in the country between 1871 and 1961. Despite Canada's large Roman Catholic population, this fact is confirmed by nine consecutive national censuses. By 1961, Roman Catholics overtook Protestants as the most numerous religious group, although—unlike Protestants—they never reached the absolute majority status (>50%).

1960s and after
The most overwhelming change was the Quiet Revolution in Quebec in the 1960s. Up through the 1950s, the province was one of the most traditional Roman Catholic areas in the world. Church attendance rates were high, and the schools were largely controlled by the Church. In the 1960s, the Catholic Church lost most of its influence in Quebec, and religiosity declined sharply. While the majority of Québécois are still professed Latin rite Roman Catholics, rates of church attendance have decreased dramatically. Since then, common-law relationships, abortion, and support for same-sex marriage are much more common in Quebec than previously,  exceeding levels in some other areas of Canada. 

English Canada also underwent secularization. The United Church of Canada, the country's largest Protestant denomination, became one of the most liberal major Protestant churches in the world. Flatt argues that in the 1960s Canada's rapid cultural changes led the United Church to end its evangelical programs and change its identity. It made revolutionary changes in its evangelistic campaigns, educational programs, moral stances, and theological image. However, membership declined sharply as the United Church affirmed a commitment to gay rights including marriage and ordination, and to the ordination of women.

In 1971, Canada was 47% Catholic, 41% Protestant, 4% Other Religion and 4% Unaffilliated.

Meanwhile, a strong current of evangelical Protestantism emerged. The largest groups are found in the Atlantic provinces and Western Canada, particularly in Alberta, Southern Manitoba and the Southern interior and Fraser Valley region of British Columbia, also known as the "Canadian Bible Belt", as well as parts of Ontario outside the Greater Toronto Area. The social environment is more conservative, somewhat more in line with that of the Midwestern and Southern United States, and same-sex marriage, abortion, and common-law relationships are less widely accepted. The evangelical movement has grown sharply after 1960, and increasingly influences public policy. Nevertheless, the overall proportion of evangelicals in Canada remains considerably lower than in the United States, and the polarization much less intense. There are very few evangelicals in Quebec and in the largest urban areas, which are generally secular, although there are several congregations above 1000 members in most large cities.

Abrahamic religions

Christianity 

The majority of Canadian Christians attend church services infrequently. Cross-national surveys of religiosity rates such as the Pew Global Attitudes Project indicate that, on average, Canadian Christians are less observant than those of the United States but are still more overtly religious than their counterparts in Western Europe. In 2002, 30% of Canadians reported to Pew researchers that religion was "very important" to them. A 2005 Gallup poll showed that 28% of Canadians consider religion to be "very important" (55% of Americans and 19% of Britons say the same). Regional differences within Canada exist, however, with British Columbia and Quebec reporting especially low metrics of traditional religious observance, as well as a significant urban-rural divide, while Saskatchewan and rural Alberta saw high rates of religious attendance. The rates for weekly church attendance are contested, with estimates running as low as 11% as per the latest Ipsos-Reid poll and as high as 25% as per Christianity Today magazine. This American magazine reported that three polls conducted by Focus on the Family, Time Canada and the Vanier Institute of the Family showed church attendance increasing for the first time in a generation, with weekly attendance at 25 per cent. This number is similar to the statistics reported by premier Canadian sociologist of religion, Prof. Reginald Bibby of the University of Lethbridge, who has been studying Canadian religious patterns since 1975. Although lower than in the US, which has reported weekly church attendance at about 40% since the Second World War, weekly church attendance rates are higher than those in Northern Europe.

As well as the large churches – Roman Catholic, United, and Anglican, which together count more than half of the Canadian population as nominal adherents – Canada also has many smaller Christian groups, including Eastern Orthodoxy. The Egyptian population in Ontario and Quebec (Greater Toronto in particular) has seen a large influx of the Coptic Orthodox population in just a few decades. The relatively large Ukrainian population of Manitoba and Saskatchewan has produced many followers of the Ukrainian Catholic and Ukrainian Orthodox Churches, while southern Manitoba has been settled largely by Mennonites. The concentration of these smaller groups often varies greatly across the country. Baptists are especially numerous in the Maritimes. The Maritimes, prairie provinces, and southwestern Ontario have significant numbers of Lutherans. Southwest Ontario has seen large numbers of German and Russian immigrants, including many Mennonites and Hutterites, as well as a significant contingent of Dutch Reformed. Alberta has seen considerable immigration from the American plains, creating a significant Mormon minority in that province. The Church of Jesus Christ of Latter-day Saints claimed to have 178,102 members (74,377 of whom in Alberta) at the end of 2007. And according to the Jehovah's Witnesses year report there are 111,963 active members (members who actively preach) in Canada.

Canada as a nation is becoming increasingly religiously diverse, especially in large urban centres such as Toronto, Vancouver, and Montreal, where minority groups and new immigrants who make up the growth in most religious groups congregate. Two significant trends become clear when the current religious landscape is examined closely. One is the loss of ‘secularized' Canadians as active and regular participants in the churches and denominations they grew up in, which were overwhelmingly Christian, while these churches remain a part of Canadians' cultural identity. The other is the increasing presence of ethnically diverse immigration within the religious makeup of the country.

As Mainline Protestants and Roman Catholics have experienced drastic losses over the past 30 years, others have been expanding rapidly: overall by 144% in ‘Eastern' religions during the 1981–1991 decade. Considering Canada's increasing reliance on immigration to bolster a low birth rate, the situation is only likely to continue to diversify. This increased influx of ethnic immigrants not only affects the types of religions represented in the Canadian context but also the increasingly multicultural and multilingual makeup of individual Christian denominations. From Chinese Anglican or Korean United Church communities, to the Lutheran focus on providing much needed services to immigrants new to the Canadian context and English language, immigration is making changes. Much as many Roman Catholics in Quebec ignore the Church's stance on birth control, abortion, or premarital sex, the churches do not dictate much of the daily lives of regular Canadians.

For some Protestant denominations, adapting to a new secular context has meant adjusting to their non-institutional roles in society by increasingly focusing on social justice. However the pull between conservative religious members and the more radical among the church members is complicated by the numbers of immigrant communities who may desire a church that fulfils a more ‘institutionally complete' role as a buffer in this new country over the current tension filled debates over same-sex marriage, ordination of women and homosexuals, or the role of women in the church. This of course will depend on the background of the immigrant population, as in the Hong Kong context where ordination of Florence Li Tim Oi happened long before women's ordination was ever raised on the Canadian Anglican church level.

As well a multicultural focus on the churches part may include non-Christian elements (such as the inclusion of a Buddhist priest in one incident) which are unwelcome to the transplanted religious community. Serving the needs and desires of different aspects of the Canadian and newly Canadian populations makes a difficult balancing act for the various mainline churches which are starved for money and active parishioners in a time when 16% of Canadians identify as non-religious and up to two-thirds of those who do identify with a denomination use the church only for its life-cycle rituals governing birth, marriage, and death. The church retains that hold in their parishioners' lives but not the commitment of time and energy necessary to support an aging institution.

Evangelical portions of the Protestant groups proclaim their growth as well but as Roger O'Tool notes they make up 7% of the Canadian population and seem to gain most of their growth from a higher birthrate. What is significant is the higher participation of their members in contrast to Mainline Protestants and Roman Catholics. This high commitment would seem to translate into the kind of political power evangelicals in the United States enjoy but despite Canada's historically Christian background as Beaman notes neatly "...[forming] the backdrop for social process" explicit religiosity appears to have not effectively moved the government towards legal discrimination against gay marriage.

There was a major religious revival in Toronto in the nineties known as the Toronto Blessing at a small Vineyard Church near the Toronto Pearson International Airport. This religious event was the largest tourist attraction to Toronto in 1994. This event was characterized by unusual religious ecstasy such as being slain in the Spirit, laughing uncontrollably, and other odd behaviour.

A 2015 study estimates some 43,000 believers in Christ from a Muslim background in Canada, most of whom belong to the evangelical tradition.

Anglican Church of Canada 
Anglican Church of Canada is the only official church of the Anglican Communion in Canada. Across Canada there are approximately 1,700 individual churches or parishes, which are organized into 30 different dioceses, each led by a bishop. The national church office is known as General Synod. The Primate is the Archbishop Linda Nicholls, national pastoral leader.

Evangelicalism  
The Evangelical Fellowship of Canada, a national evangelical alliance, member of the World Evangelical Alliance was founded in 1964 in Toronto. It brings together 43 Evangelical Christian denominations.

The Pentecostal Assemblies of Canada were founded in 1914.

The Canadian Baptist Ministries were founded in 1944.

Anabaptism

Hutterites 

In mid-1870s Hutterites moved from Europe to the Dakota Territory in the United States to avoid military service and other persecutions. During World War I Hutterites suffered from persecutions in the United States because they are pacifist and refused military service. They then moved almost all of their communities to Canada in the Western provinces of Alberta and Manitoba in 1918. In the 1940s, there were 52 Hutterite colonies in Canada.

Today, more than 75% of the world's Hutterite colonies are located in Canada, mainly in Alberta, Manitoba and Saskatchewan, the rest being almost exclusively in the United States. The Hutterite population in North America is about 45,000 people.

Mennonites 

First Mennonites arrived in Canada in 1786 from Pennsylvania, but following Mennonites arrived directly from Europe. The Mennonite Church Canada had about 35,000 members in 1998.

Catholicism 

The Catholic Church in Canada, under the spiritual leadership of the Pope and the Canadian Conference of Catholic Bishops, has the largest number of adherents to a religion in Canada, with 38.7% of Canadians (13.07 million) reported as Catholics in the 2011 National Household Survey, in 72 dioceses across the provinces and territories, served by about 8,000 priests. It was the first European faith in what is now Canada, arriving in 1497 when John Cabot landed on Newfoundland and raised the Venetian and Papal banners, claiming the land for his sponsor King Henry VII of England, while recognizing the religious authority of the Roman Catholic Church.

The entire Catholic Church in Canada is placed under the Primate of Canada which corresponds to the Archdiocese of Quebec and its bishop, the Primate of Canada. Actually, Gérald Cyprien Lacroix is the Primate of Canada. The Pope is represented in Canada by the Apostolic Nunciature in Canada (Ottawa).

Eastern Orthodoxy 

Adherents of Eastern Orthodox Christianity in Canada belong to several ecclesiastical jurisdictions. Historically, Eastern Orthodoxy was introduced to Canada during the course of 19th century, mainly through emigration of Christians from Eastern Europe and the Middle East. Honouring such diverse heritage, Eastern Orthodoxy in Canada is traditionally organized in accordance with patrimonial jurisdictions of autocephalous Eastern Orthodox Churches, each of them having its own hierarchy with dioceses and parishes.

According to 2011 census data, there were 550,690 Orthodox Christians. The Greek Orthodox community constitutes the largest Eastern Orthodox community in Canada, with 220,255 adherents, followed by other communities: Russian Orthodox (25,245), Ukrainian Orthodox (23,845), Serbian Orthodox (22,780), Romanian Orthodox (7,090), Macedonian Orthodox (4,945), Bulgarian Orthodox (1,765), Antiochian Orthodox (1,220) and several other minor communities within Eastern Orthodoxy. A number of  207,480 adherents reported only as Christian Orthodox.

Oriental Orthodoxy 

Adherents of Oriental Orthodox Christianity in Canada also belong to several ethnic communities and ecclesiastical jurisdictions. According to 2011 census data, Coptic Orthodox community constitutes the largest Oriental Orthodox community in Canada, with 16,255 adherents. It is followed by other communities: Armenian Orthodox (13,730), Ethiopian Orthodox (3,025), Syriac Orthodox (3,060) and several other minor communities within Oriental Orthodoxy.

The Church of Jesus Christ of Latter-day Saints 

The Church of Jesus Christ of Latter-day Saints (LDS Church) has had a presence in Canada since its organization in New York State in 1830. Canada has been used as a refuge territory by members of the LDS Church to avoid enforcement of anti-polygamy laws by the United States government. The first LDS Church in Canada was established in 1895 in what would become Alberta; it was the first stake of the Church to be established outside the United States. The LDS Church has founded several communities in Alberta.

In the 2021 census sampling, about 0.2% of the population (equal to about 87,725 people) claimed to members of the LDS Church.
In 2021, the LDS Church claimed around 200,000 members in Canada; It has congregations in all Canadian provinces and territories and possess at least one temple in six of the ten provinces, including the oldest LDS temple outside the United States. Alberta is the province with the most members of the LDS Church in Canada, having approximately 40% of the total of Canadian LDS Church members and representing 2% of the total population of the province (the National Household survey of 2011 has Alberta with over 50% of the Canadian Mormons and 1.6% of the province's population), followed by Ontario and British Columbia.

Islam

Four years after Canada's founding in 1867, the 1871 Canadian Census found 13 Muslims among the population.  The first Canadian mosque was constructed in Edmonton in 1938, when there were approximately 700 Muslims in the country.  This building is now part of the museum at Fort Edmonton Park. The years after World War II saw a small increase in the Muslim population. However, Muslims were still a distinct minority. It was only with the removal of European immigration preferences in the late 1960s that Muslims began to arrive in significant numbers.

According to Canada's 2001 census, there were 579,740 Muslims in Canada, just under 2% of the population. In 2006, the Muslim population was estimated to be 0.8 million or about 2.6%. In 2010, the Pew Research Centre estimated there were about 0.9 million Muslims in Canada. In the 2011 National Housing Survey, Muslims constituted 3.2% of the population making them largest religious adherents after Christianity. Islam is the fastest growing religion in Canada. Sunni Islam is followed by the majority while there are significant numbers of Shia Muslims. Ahmadiyya also has a significant proportion with more than 25,000 Ahmadis living in Canada. There are also non-denominational Muslims.

In 2007, the CBC introduced a popular television sitcom called Little Mosque on the Prairie, a contemporary reflection and critical commentary on attitudes towards Islam in Canada. In 2008, the Prime Minister of Canada, Stephen Harper, visited the Baitun Nur Mosque, the largest mosque in Canada for its inaugural session with the Head of the Ahmadiyya Muslim Community.

Judaism

The Jewish community in Canada is almost as old as the nation itself. The earliest documentation of Jews in Canada are British Army records from the Seven Years' War from 1754. In 1760, General Jeffrey Amherst, 1st Baron Amherst attacked and won Montreal for the British. In his regiment there were several Jews, including four among his officer corps, most notably Lieutenant Aaron Hart who is considered the father of Canadian Jewry. In 1807, Ezekiel Hart was elected to the legislature of Lower Canada, becoming the first Jew in the British Empire to hold an official position. Hart was sworn in on a Hebrew Bible as opposed to a Christian Bible. The next day an objection was raised that Hart had not taken the oath in the manner required for sitting in the assembly – an oath of abjuration, which would have required Hart to swear "on the true faith of a Christian". Hart was expelled from the assembly, only to be re-elected two more times. In 1768, the first synagogue in Canada was built in Montreal, the Spanish and Portuguese Synagogue of Montreal. In 1832, partly because of the work of Ezekiel Hart, a law was passed that guaranteed Jews the same political rights and freedoms as Christians.

The Jewish population saw a growth during the 1880s due to the pogroms of Russia and growing anti-Semitism. Between the years of 1880 and 1930 the Jewish population grew to 155,000. In 1872, Henry Nathan, Jr. became the first Jewish Member of Parliament, representing the Victoria, BC area in the newly created House of Commons. The First World War halted the flow of immigrants into Canada, and after the War there was a change in Canada's immigration policy to limit the immigration of people from "non-preferred nations", i.e., those not from the United Kingdom or otherwise White Anglo-Saxon Protestant nations. In June 1939 Canada and the United States were the last hope for 907 Jewish refugees aboard the steamship SS St. Louis which had been denied landing in Havana although the passengers had entry visas. The Canadian government ignored the protests of Canadian Jewish organizations. King said the crisis was not a "Canadian problem" and Blair added in a letter to O.D. Skelton, Undersecretary of State for External Affairs, dated June 16, 1939, "No country could open its doors wide enough to take in the hundreds of thousands of Jewish people who want to leave Europe: the line must be drawn somewhere." The ship finally had to return to Germany. During the Second World War almost twenty thousand Canadian Jews volunteered to fight overseas. Nearly 40,000 Holocaust survivors moved to Canada in the late 1940s to rebuild their lives.

In 2010, the Canadian Jewish community was the fourth largest in the world and practices in both of the official languages of Canada. There is an increase in the number of people that use Hebrew, other than religious ceremonies, while there is a decline in the Yiddish language. Most of Canada's Jews live in Ontario and Quebec, with Toronto being the largest Jewish population centre. In 2009, anti-Semitic incidents jumped fivefold.

Baháʼí Faith

The Canadian community is one of the earliest western communities of Baháʼís, at one point sharing a joint National Spiritual Assembly with the United States, and is a co-recipient of `Abdu'l-Bahá's Tablets of the Divine Plan.  The first North American woman to declare herself a Baháʼí was Kate C. Ives, of Canadian ancestry, though not living in Canada at the time. Moojan Momen, in reviewing "The Origins of the Baháʼí Community of Canada, 1898–1948" notes that "the Magee family... are credited with bringing the Baháʼí Faith to Canada. Edith Magee became a Baháʼí in 1898 in Chicago and returned to her home in London, Ontario, where four other female members of her family became Baháʼís. This predominance of women converts became a feature of the Canadian Baháʼí community..."

Druze Faith
In 2018, there were 25,000 Druze living in Canada, and fewer than 5,000 of them live in the Greater Toronto Area. They are mostly of Lebanese and Syrian descent. Druze practice Druzism, a monotheistic religion encompasses aspects of Islam, Hinduism, Christianity, Judaism and Greek philosophy, among influences.

Indian religions

Hinduism

Hinduism is a minority religion followed by 2.3% of the population of the Canada. According to the 2021 census, there are 828,195 Hindus in Canada.

Hindus in Canada are generally Indian immigrants (mainly Punjabi and Haryanvi) from India who began arriving in British Columbia about 100 years ago and continue to immigrate today. There is a significant Sri Lankan Tamil Hindus in Canada who immigrated from Sri Lanka during the 1983 communal riots in Sri Lanka. There are also Nepali Hindus from Nepal and from Caribbean Hindus from Trinidad and Guyana. There are also Canadian converts to the various sects of Hinduism through the efforts of the Hare Krishna movement, the Gurus during the last 50 years, and other organizations.

The vast majority of Hindus reside in Ontario (primarily in Toronto, Scarborough, Brampton, Hamilton, Windsor and Ottawa), Quebec (primarily around the Montreal area) and British Columbia, (primarily around the Vancouver area).

Buddhism

According to the 2011 Census, Buddhism is followed by 1.1% of the population of the Canada.

Buddhism has been practised in Canada for more than a century and in recent years has grown dramatically. Buddhism arrived in Canada with the arrival of Chinese labourers in the territories during the 19th century. Modern Buddhism in Canada traces to Japanese immigration during the late 19th century. The first Japanese Buddhist temple in Canada was built at the Ishikawa Hotel in Vancouver in 1905. Over time, the Japanese Jōdo Shinshū branch of Buddhism became the prevalent form of Buddhism in Canada and established the largest Buddhist organization in Canada.

Sikhism

According to the 2011 census there were 468,670 Sikhs in Canada.  Sikhs have been in Canada since at least 1897 and are the largest religious group among South Asian Canadians. British Columbia is the only jurisdiction outside of South Asia with Sikhism as the second most followed religion among the population.

Jainism

The first official Jain temple was established in Toronto in 1988. This temple served both the Digambar and Svetambara communities.

Other religions

Modern Paganism

Census data showed Modern Paganism grew by 281 per cent between 1991 and 2001, making it the fastest growing religion in Canada during that decade.

Neo-Druidism
In Neo-Druid history a notable community was the Reformed Druids of North America, one of whose four founders was Canadian, which served both the US Druid community and the Canadian Druid community. Neo-Druidism largely spread in Canada through the Ancient Order of the Druids during the 19th century.

Irreligion 

Irreligious Canadians include atheists, agnostics, and humanists. The surveys may also include those who are spiritual, deists, and pantheists. In 1991 they made up 12.3% of the Canadian population. In the 2001 census this number increased to 16.2% and increased again in 2011 to 23.9%. Some non-religious Canadians have formed associations, such as the Humanist Association of Canada, Toronto Secular Alliance or the Centre for Inquiry Canada, as well as a number of University Campus Groups.

Age and religion
According to the 2001 census, the major religions in Canada have the following median age. Canada has a median age of 37.3.

Presbyterian 46.1
United Church 44.1
Anglican 43.8
Lutheran 43.3
Jewish 41.5
Greek Orthodox 40.7
Baptist 39.3
Buddhist 38.0
Roman Catholic 37.8
Pentecostal 33.5
No Religion 31.9
Hindu 30.2
Sikh 29.7
Muslim 28.1

Census results

Historical trends since 1900
Sources: Based on National trajectory Census since end´s XIX Century, specially 1991, 2001 and 2011 Census, Catholic membership evolution since 1901, Overall Muslim membership evolution since 1901, Pew Center Research and Historical information from the Canadian Encyclopedia

Raw data
In the Canada 2011 National Household Survey (the 2011 census did not ask about religious affiliation but the survey sent to a subset of the population did), 69% of the Canadian population list Roman Catholicism or Protestantism or another Christian denomination as their religion, down 8% from the Canada 2001 Census, where 77% of the population listed a Christian religion. Representing two out of five Canadians, the Roman Catholic Church in Canada is by far the country's largest single denomination. Secularization has been growing since the 1960s. In 2011, 23.9% declared no religious affiliation, compared to 16.5% in 2001.

In recent years there have been substantial rises in non-Christian religions in Canada. From the 1991 to 2011, Islam grew by 316%, Hinduism 217%, Sikhism 209%, and Buddhism 124%. The growth of non-Christian religions expressed as a percentage of Canada's population rose from 4% in 1991 to 8% in 2011. In terms of the ratio of non-Christians to Christians, it rose from 19 Christians (95% of religious population) to 1 non-Christian (5% of religious population) in 1991 to 8 Christians (89%) to 1 non-Christian (11%) in 2011, a rise of 135% of the ratio of non-Christians to Christians, or a decline of 6.5% of Christians to non-Christians, in 20 years.

1Includes Pagan, Wicca, Unity – New Thought – Pantheist, Scientology, Rastafarian, New Age, Gnostic, Satanist, etc.

See also
List of prime ministers of Canada by religious affiliation

Notes

References

Further reading

 
 
 

 
 
  Kevin N. Flatt. After Evangelicalism: The Sixties and the United Church of Canada (2013)  excerpt and text search

 

 
 Jamie S. Scott (2012) The Religions of Canadians. University of Toronto Press

External links

Canadian encyclopedia - Religion (in Canada)
Canadian Conference of Catholic Bishops
Anglican Church of Canada